These are the results of 2017 BWF World Senior Championships' 40+ events.

Men's singles

Seeds
 Lars Klintrup (second round)
 Joy T. Antony (semifinals, bronze medal)
 Hosemari Fujimoto (champion, gold medal)
 Carl Jennings (quarterfinals)
 Huang Chia-lung (first round)
 Thaweesak Koetsriphan (quarterfinals)
 Yu Hin Siu (first round)
 Morten Aarup (second round)

Finals

Top half

Section 1

Section 2

Bottom half

Section 3

Section 4

Women's singles

Seeds
 Rebecca Pantaney (semifinals, bronze medal)
 Claudia Vogelgsang (champion, gold medal)

Group A

Group B

Group C

Group D

Finals

Men's doubles

Seeds
 Morten Aarup / Carsten Loesch (quarterfinals)
 Carl Jennings / Mark Trebble (quarterfinals)
 Manjula Sampath Fernando / Nishantha Dayan de Silva Jayasinghe (second round)
 Supalerk Jantarapisal / Thaweesak Koetsriphan (second round)

Finals

Top half

Section 1

Section 2

Bottom half

Section 3

Section 4

Women's doubles

Seeds
 Rebecca Pantaney / Lynne Swan (semifinals, bronze medal)
 Louise Culyer /  Dorte Steenberg (champions, gold medal)

Group A

Group B

Group C

Group D

Finals

Mixed doubles

Seeds
 Carsten Loesch / Dorte Steenberg (champions, gold medal)
 Vadim Nazarov / Olga Kuznetsova (semifinals, bronze medal)
 Hosemari Fujimoto / Ayumi Takakura (semifinals, bronze medal)
 Carl Jennings / Joanne Muggeridge (final, silver medal)

Finals

Top half

Section 1

Section 2

Bottom half

Section 3

Section 4

References

Men's singles
Results

Women's singles
Group A Results
Group B Results
Group C Results
Group D Results
Finals Results

Men's doubles
Results

Women's doubles
Group A Results
Group B Results
Group C Results
Group D Results
Finals Results

Mixed doubles
Results

2017 BWF World Senior Championships